Richard 'Rik' Evans (born 1954), is a male retired cyclist who competed for Great Britain and England.

Cycling career
Evans represented Great Britain in the 1973 UCI Track Cycling World Championships winning a silver medal in the team pursuit.

He represented England and won a gold medal in the team pursuit event, at the 1974 British Commonwealth Games in Christchurch, New Zealand. He rode for London and was the 1977 National team pursuit champion.

References

1954 births
English male cyclists
Commonwealth Games medallists in cycling
Commonwealth Games gold medallists for England
Cyclists at the 1974 British Commonwealth Games
Living people
Medallists at the 1974 British Commonwealth Games